The Nehru Trophy Boat Race is an annual vallam kali held in the Punnamada Lake near Alappuzha, Kerala, India. Vallam Kali or Vallamkaliy literally means boat play/game, but can be translated to boat race in English. The most popular event of the race is the competition of Chundan Vallams (snake boats). Hence the race is also known as Snake Boat Race in English. Other categories of boats which participate in various events of the race are Churulan Vallam, Iruttukuthy Vallam, Odi Vallam, Veppu Vallam (Vaipu Vallam), Vadakkanody Vallam and Kochu Vallam.

History
This Boat race has its origin in the Kerala district Alappuzha and was inaugurated in 1952 by Prime Minister Jawaharlal Nehru. The winner was awarded a trophy in the name of Jawaharlal Nehru.

In 2019, Nehru Trophy Boat Race was also made a part of the newly constituted CBL - Champions Boat League and Star Sports Network become its television broadcasting partner.

The 2020 and 2021 seasons of the league were dropped due to the COVID-19 pandemic.

Winners
Karichal chundan has the most number of Nehru trophies,a total of 15. The current hat-trick title for continuously winning three times in a row is held by Kumarakom Town Boat Club under the leadership of Raju Vadakkathu Kumarakom Kottayam.

See also
 President's Trophy Boat Race
 Kumarakom Boat Race
 Triprayar Boat Race
 Kandassankadavu Boat Race
 Kallada Boat Race
 Champakulam Moolam Boat Race
 Aranmula Uthrattadi Vallamkali
 Payippad Jalotsavam

References

External links

 Official Nehru Trophy Boat Race Website
 www.snakeboatrace.com

Boat races in Kerala
Monuments and memorials to Jawaharlal Nehru
Festivals in Alappuzha district
1952 establishments in India
Recurring sporting events established in 1954